Miskito may refer to:
 Miskito people, ethnic group in Honduras and Nicaragua
 Miskito Sambu, branch of Miskito people with African admixture
 Tawira Miskito, branch of Miskito people of largely indigenous origin
 Miskito language, original language of the Miskito people
 Miskito Coastal Creole, English based creole spoken in Nicaragua
 Miskito Languages, alternate name for Misumalpan languages
 Miskito Coast, alternate name for Mosquito Coast
 Miskito Cays, group of small islands in the Caribbean near Nicaragua

See also
Mosquito (disambiguation)
Moskito (disambiguation)